The 13247/48 Kamakhya–Rajendra Nagar Capital Express and 13245/46 New Jalpaiguri–Rajendra Nagar Capital Express are the Express trains belonging to East Central Railway zone that runs between Kamakhya Junction, New Jalpaiguri and  in India. It is operated with 13247/48 and 13245/46 train numbers on four days and three days respectively each week.

Service

The 13245/46 Capital Express has average speed of 35 km/hr and covers 490  km in 14h. The 13247/48 Capital Express has average speed of 39 km/hr and covers 942 km in 24h.

Halts 

The important halts of the train are:

ASSAM
 
 Goalpara Town
 

WEST BENGAL
 
 Hasimara Railway Station
 Dalgaon Railway Station
 Binnaguri Junction
 
  (reversal)
 
 

BIHAR
 
 
 
 
 
 
 
 
 
 
 
 
 Banka Ghat

Coach composition

The train has LHB coach. The train consists of 22 coaches:

 1 AC First Cum 2 Ac-class
 4 AC II Tier
 4 AC III Tier
 8 Sleeper Coaches
 3 General
 2 EOG Rake

Traction

Both trains are hauled by a Siliguri Diesel Loco Shed-based WDP-4 / WDP-4B / WDP-4D locomotive from KYQ / NJP to KIR. From KIR to RJPB it is hauled by an Electric Loco Shed, Gomoh-based WAP-7 locomotive and vice versa.

Reversal

Rake sharing

 13245 / 13246 [New Jalpaiguri-Rajendra Nagar Terminal Capital Express] shares its rake with 13247 / 13248 [Kamakhya Junction–Rajendra Nagar Terminal Capital Express].

See also 

 Rajendra Nagar Terminal railway station
 New Jalpaiguri Junction railway station
 Indore–Guwahati Weekly Express
 Guwahati–Rajendra Nagar Capital Express

External links 

 13245/Capital Express
 13246/Capital Express

References 

Transport in Patna
Transport in Jalpaiguri
Named passenger trains of India
Rail transport in West Bengal
Rail transport in Bihar
Express trains in India
Transport in Siliguri